Charles Kinney (July 7, 1850 – September 15, 1918) was a Republican politician who was Ohio Secretary of State from 1897 to 1901.

Life and career
Kinney was born July 7, 1850 in Springville, Kentucky. When his father died in 1861, he moved to Columbus, Indiana, with his mother and brother, where he stayed until 1872. He graduated from high school there in 1866. He practiced the printer's trade until moving to Portsmouth, Ohio in 1872. He was in mercantile for four years, until taking up printing again. He was then appointed Deputy Treasurer of Scioto County, Ohio in 1877, serving until 1880. He was elected County Treasurer in 1883, and served four years. He served as chief clerk under Secretaries of State Ryan and Taylor, and was elected as Secretary of State in 1896, and re-elected in 1898.

After his second term ended, Kinney engaged in corporate law in Columbus.

Kinney died September 15, 1918.

Kinney was married October 8, 1879 to Letitia H. Yoakley of Portsmouth. They had a daughter named Lida.

Publications
 - a book of poetry

References

External links

Secretaries of State of Ohio
Ohio Republicans
People from Portsmouth, Ohio
People from South Shore, Kentucky
Writers from Indiana
Writers from Kentucky
Writers from Ohio
1850 births
1918 deaths
19th-century American politicians
People from Columbus, Ohio